Transvenidae is a family of parasitic spiny-headed (or thorny-headed) worms in the order Echinorhynchida. This family contains three species divided into two genera.

Taxonomy and description
Phylogenetic analysis has been conducted.

Species
There are three genera and six species in the family Transvenidae:

Paratrajectura Amin, Heckmann et Ali, 2018
Paratrajectura longcementglandatus Amin, Heckmann et Ali, 2018

Sclerocollum Schmidt and Paperna, 1978
Sclerocollum robustum (Edmonds, 1964)
Sclerocollum rubrimaris Schmidt and Paperna, 1978
Sclerocollum saudii Al-Jahdali, 2010

Trajectura Pichelin & Cribb, 2001
Trajectura is distinguished by the possession of only two cement glands and an anterior conical projection (function unknown) on the females.

Trajectura ikedai (Machida, 1992)

Diplosentis ikedai was found to share similar anatomical features (only two cement glands and an anterior conical projection on females) was renamed T. ikedai.

Trajectura perinsolens Pichelin and Cribb, 2001

T. perinsolens Was found parasitising the New Guinea wrasse Anampses neoguinaicus from the Great Barrier Reef, Queensland, Australia.

Transvena Pichelin & Cribb, 2001

Transvena annulospinosa Pichelin and Cribb, 2001

Hosts

Notes

References

Echinorhynchida
Acanthocephala families